The Senate Electoral Tribunal (SET) is an electoral tribunal that decides election protests in the Senate of the Philippines. It consists of 6 senators nominated by the Senate, and 3 justices of the Supreme Court of the Philippines, who are designated by the Chief Justice. The equivalent tribunals for elections to the lower house is the House of Representatives Electoral Tribunal and to president and vice presidents is Presidential Electoral Tribunal.

The SET is located at SET-HRET Building, Commission on Audit Compound, Quezon City.

Members of the Tribunal receive a monthly allowance of 100,000 Philippine pesos on top of their regular salary.

History 
In the 1935 constitution, there were nine members, with three designated by the Chief Justice, three by the largest party in the Senate, and another three from second-largest party. In Tañada and Macapagal v. Cuenco, et. al., the Supreme Court ruled that the Senate may not elect members who have not been nominated by the parties specified in the constitution. This was after the Nacionalista Party moved to include 2 more of its members in 1956 after Lorenzo Tañada, the sole senator not a member of the Nacionalista Party, nominated only himself.

In the 1987 constitution, there were still nine members, but the six senators were now based via proportional representation from the political parties therein.

Membership
The chairperson of the SET is always the most senior justice of the Supreme Court that's sitting in the tribunal.

The three members from the Supreme Court are designated by the chief justice. While there's no regular occurrence on when a chief justice designates members, this is almost certainly done when there is a new justice of the Supreme Court.

The six members from the Senate are named in a resolution of the Senate. This always happens at the organization of the chamber at the start of every new Congress.

These are the members in the 18th Congress, which first convened on July 22, 2019, and whose senators' terms ended on June 30, 2022.

Former senator members

Cases 
Most cases, such as the Pimentel v. Zubiri case, are election protests, and most are usually resolved when the protestant (the losing candidate) runs on another election; at this point, the tribunal will rule that they have abandoned the case.

A few, such as the David v. Poe case, are quo warranto petitions, or questioning if the winner is actually qualified to be a senator.

Successful cases:
Romero v. Sanidad (1946)
Rodriguez v. Tan (1947)
Recto v. de Vera  (1949)
Pimentel v. Zubiri (2007)
Tribunal granted the petition in 2011, declaring Koko Pimentel as duly-elected senator.
Failed cases (since 2000):

 Enrile vs. Recto et. al. (2001)
 Enrile withdrew the protest in 2002.
 Osmeña vs. Biazon, et. al. (2004)
 Osmeña withdrew the protest in 2006.
 David v. Poe (2015)
 Dismissed the petition in 2015; the Supreme Court then upheld the decision of the SET in 2016
 Tolentino v. de Lima (2016) 
 Tolentino withdrew the protest in 2018.
 Mansilungan v. Pimentel and Adan v. Pimentel (2019)
 Dismissed due to lack of merit in 2020.

Seat 
The tribunal was formerly found in the SET-HRET Building, Commission on Audit Compound in Quezon City. However, that building was condemned, and the SET was transferred to the Philippine International Convention Center in Pasay. It has then transferred to the Sugar Center Building that houses the Sugar Regulatory Administration in Quezon City.

References

External links
Official website

Judiciary of the Philippines
Senate of the Philippines
Electoral courts
1940 establishments in the Philippines